The 1978 Virginia Slims of Boston  was a women's tennis tournament played on indoor carpet courts at the Boston University Walter Brown Arena  in Boston, Massachusetts in the United States that was part of the 1978 Virginia Slims World Championship Series. It was the fifth edition of the tournament and was held from March 13 through March 19, 1978. Third-seeded Evonne Goolagong Cawley won the singles title and earned $20,000 first-prize money. It was the only tournament of the year apart from Wimbledon to feature the top four players Evert, Goolagong, King and Navratilova.

Finals

Singles
 Evonne Goolagong Cawley defeated  Chris Evert 4–6, 6–1, 6–4

Doubles
 Billie Jean King /  Martina Navratilova defeated  Evonne Goolagong Cawley /  Betty Stöve 6–3, 6–2

Prize money

References

External links
 Women's Tennis Association (WTA) tournament details

Virginia Slims of Boston
Virginia Slims of Boston
1978 in sports in Massachusetts
1978 in American tennis